Lesotho was scheduled to compete at the 2019 World Aquatics Championships in Gwangju, South Korea from 12 to 28 July, but they withdrew.

Swimming

Lesotho had entered three swimmers before withdrawing.

Men

Women

References

Nations at the 2019 World Aquatics Championships
Lesotho at the World Aquatics Championships
World Aquatics Championships